Salicornia is a genus of succulent, halophytic (salt tolerant) flowering plants in the family Amaranthaceae that grow in salt marshes, on beaches, and among mangroves. Salicornia species are native to North America, Europe, Central Asia, and southern Africa. Common names for the genus include glasswort, pickleweed, picklegrass, and marsh samphire; these common names are also used for some species not in Salicornia. To French speakers in Atlantic Canada, they are known colloquially as titines de souris ('mouse tits'). The main European species is often eaten, called marsh samphire in Britain, and the main North American species is occasionally sold in grocery stores or appears on restaurant menus as sea beans, samphire greens or sea asparagus.

Description 

The Salicornia species are small annual herbs. They grow prostrate to erect, their simple or branched stems are succulent, hairless, and appear to be jointed. The opposite leaves are strongly reduced to small fleshy scales with a narrow dry margin, hairless, unstalked and united at the base, thus enclosing and forming a succulent sheath around the stem, which gives it the appearance of being composed of jointed segments. Many species are green, but their foliage turns red in autumn. Older stems may be somewhat woody basally. 

All stems terminate in spike-like apparently jointed inflorescences. Each joint consists of two opposite minute bracts with an (1-) 3-flowered cyme tightly embedded in cavities of the main axis and partly hidden by the bracts. The flowers are arranged in a triangle, both lateral flowers beneath the central flower. The hermaphrodite flowers are more or less radially symmetric, with a perianth of three fleshy tepals united nearly to the apex. There are 1–2 stamens and an ovary with two stigmas.

The perianth is persistent in fruit. The fruit wall (pericarp) is membranous. The vertical seed is ellipsoid, with yellowish brown, membranous, hairy seed coat. The seed contains no perisperm (feeding tissue).

Like most members of the subfamily Salicornioideae, Salicornia species use the C3 carbon fixation pathway to take in carbon dioxide from the surrounding atmosphere.

Taxonomy

The genus Salicornia was first described in 1753 by Carl Linnaeus. Salicornia europaea was selected as the type species.

The genus probably originated during the Miocene in the region between the Mediterranean Basin and Central Asia. Evolving from within the perennial and frost-sensitive former genus Sarcocornia (now shown to be paraphyletic), the annual, strongly inbreeding and frost-tolerant Salicornia diversified during the late Pliocene to early Pleistocene. By events of intercontinental dispersals, they reached southern Africa twice and North America at least three times. Two tetraploid lineages expanded rapidly, with the ability to colonize lower belts of the salt marshes than their diploid relatives. Inbreeding and geographical isolation led to a large number of reproductive isolated species that are only weakly differentiated.

The taxonomic classification of this genus is extremely difficult (with one paper calling it a "taxonomic nightmare"). The determination of species seems almost impossible for non-specialists. The reasons for these difficulties are the reduced habit with weak morphological differentiation and high phenotypic variability. As the succulent plants lose their characteristics while drying, herbarium specimens often cannot be determined with certainty and are less suited for taxonomic studies.

Molecular phylogenetic studies have regularly revised the circumscription of the genus. It was considered distinct from Sarcocornia in 2007 and 2012 studies. A 2017 study resulted in Sarcocornia being sunk into Salicornia, substantially increasing the size of the genus, which was divided into four subgenera.

Species

, Plants of the World Online accepted the following species:

Salicornia alpini Lag.
Salicornia ambigua Michx.
Salicornia andina Phil.
Salicornia bigelovii Torr.
Salicornia blackiana Ulbr.
Salicornia brachiata Roxb.
Salicornia capensis (Moss) Piirainen & G.Kadereit
Salicornia crassispica G.L.Chu
Salicornia cuscoensis Gutte & G.K.Müll. ex Freitag, M.Á.Alonso & M.B.Crespo
Salicornia decumbens (Toelken) Piirainen & G.Kadereit
Salicornia decussata (S.Steffen, Mucina & G.Kadereit) Piirainen & G.Kadereit
Salicornia disarticulata Moss
Salicornia dunensis (Moss ex Adamson) Piirainen & G.Kadereit
Salicornia erectispica G.L.Chu
Salicornia europaea L.
Salicornia fruticosa (L.) L.
Salicornia globosa (Paul G.Wilson) Piirainen & G.Kadereit
Salicornia helmutii Piirainen & G.Kadereit
Salicornia hispanica (Fuente, Rufo & Sánchez Mata) Piirainen & G.Kadereit
Salicornia lagascae (Fuente, Rufo & Sánchez Mata) Piirainen & G.Kadereit
Salicornia littorea (Moss) Piirainen & G.Kadereit
Salicornia magellanica Phil.
Salicornia maritima S.L.Wolff & Jefferies
Salicornia × marshallii (Lambinon & Vanderp.) Stace
Salicornia meyeriana Moss
Salicornia mossambicensis (Brenan) Piirainen & G.Kadereit
Salicornia mossiana (Toelken) Piirainen & G.Kadereit
Salicornia natalensis Bunge ex Ung.-Sternb.
Salicornia neei Lag.
Salicornia nitens P.W.Ball & Tutin
Salicornia obclavata (Yaprak) Piirainen & G.Kadereit
Salicornia obscura P.W.Ball & Tutin
Salicornia pachystachya Bunge ex Ung.-Sternb.
Salicornia pacifica Standl.
Salicornia perennans Willd.
Salicornia perennis Mill.
Salicornia perrieri A.Chev.
Salicornia persica Akhani
Salicornia perspolitana Akhani
Salicornia praecox A.Chev.
Salicornia procumbens Sm.
Salicornia pruinosa (Fuente, Rufo & Sánchez Mata) Piirainen & G.Kadereit
Salicornia pulvinata R.E.Fr.
Salicornia quinqueflora Bunge ex Ung.-Sternb.
Salicornia rubra A.Nelson
Salicornia senegalensis A.Chev.
Salicornia sinus-persica Akhani
Salicornia tegetaria (S.Steffen, Mucina & G.Kadereit) Piirainen & G.Kadereit
Salicornia terminalis (Toelken) Piirainen & G.Kadereit
Salicornia uniflora Toelken
Salicornia utahensis Tidestr.
Salicornia virginica L.
Salicornia xerophila (Toelken) Piirainen & G.Kadereit

Distribution and habitat 

The species of Salicornia are widely distributed over the Northern Hemisphere and in southern Africa, ranging from the subtropics to subarctic regions. There is one species present in New Zealand.

They grow in coastal salt marshes and in inland salty habitats like shores of salt lakes. Salicornia species are halophytes and can generally tolerate immersion in salt water (hygrohalophytes).

Ecology 
Salicornia species are used as food plants by the larvae of some Lepidoptera species, including the Coleophora case-bearers C. atriplicis and C. salicorniae; the latter feeds exclusively on Salicornia spp.

Uses

Culinary 

S. europaea is edible, either cooked or raw, as are S. rubra and S. depressa. In England, S. europaea is one of several plants known as samphire (including rock samphire); the term samphire is believed to be a corruption of the French name, [herbe de] Saint-Pierre, which means "St. Peter's herb".

In Hawaii, where it is known as 'sea asparagus', it is often blanched and used as a topping for salads or accompaniment for fish.

In addition to S. europaea, the seeds of S. bigelovii yield an edible oil. S. bigelovii's edibility is compromised somewhat because it contains saponins, which are toxic under certain conditions.

Umari keerai is cooked and eaten or pickled. It is also used as fodder for cattle,  sheep and goats. In Kalpitiya, Sri Lanka, it is used to feed donkeys.

On the east coast of Canada, the plant is known as 'samphire greens' and is a local delicacy. In southeast Alaska, it is known as beach asparagus. In Nova Scotia, Canada, they are known as crow's foot greens. In British Columbia, they are known as sea asparagus. In the United States, they are known as 'sea beans' when used for culinary purposes. Other names include sea green bean, sea pickle, and marsh samphire.

In India, researchers at the Central Salt and Marine Chemicals Research Institute developed a process to yield culinary salt from S. brachiata. The resulting product is known as vegetable salt and sold under the brand name Saloni.

Dehydrated, pulverized Salicornia is sold under the brand name "Green Salt" as a salt substitute claimed to be as salty in taste as table salt, but with less sodium.

Pharmacological research 
In South Korea, Phyto Corporation has developed a technology of extracting low-sodium salt from S. europaea, a salt-accumulating plant. The company claims that the naturally derived plant salt is effective in treating high blood pressure and fatty liver disease by reducing sodium intake. The company has also developed a desalted Salicornia powder containing antioxidative and antithrombus polyphenols, claimed to be effective in treating obesity and arteriosclerosis, as well as providing a means to help resolve global food shortages.

Environmental uses 

Pickleweed is used in phytoextraction. It is highly effective at removing selenium from soil, which is absorbed by the plant and then released into the atmosphere to be dispersed by prevailing winds. Pickleweed (S. bigelovii) has been found to have average volatilization rates 10–100 times higher than other species.

Industrial use

Historical 

The ashes of glasswort and saltwort plants and of kelp were long used as a source of soda ash (mainly sodium carbonate) for glassmaking and soapmaking. The introduction of the LeBlanc process for industrial production of soda ash superseded the use of plant sources in the first half of the 19th century.

Umari keerai is used as raw material in paper and board factories.

Contemporary 

Because S. bigelovii can be grown using saltwater and its seeds contain high levels of unsaturated oil (30 wt. %, mostly linoleic acid) and protein (35 wt. %), it can be used to produce animal feedstuff and as a biofuel feedstock on coastal land where conventional crops cannot be grown. Adding nitrogen-based fertiliser to the seawater appears to increase the rate of growth and the eventual height of the plant, and  the effluent from marine aquaculture (e.g. shrimp farming) is a suggested use for this purpose.

Experimental fields of Salicornia have been planted in Ras al-Zawr (Saudi Arabia), Eritrea (northeast Africa) and Sonora (northwest Mexico) aimed at the production of biodiesel. The company responsible for the Sonora trials (Global Seawater) claims  between 225 and 250 gallons of BQ-9000 biodiesel can be produced per hectare (approximately 2.5 acres) of salicornia, and is promoting a $35 million scheme to create a  salicornia farm in Bahia de Kino.

Stems and roots of S. brachiata plants have a high cellulose content (ca. 30 wt. %), whereas tender stem tips exhibit a low cellulose content (9.2 wt. %). S. brachiata revealed the dominance of rhamnose, arabinose, mannose, galactose, and glucose, with meager presence of ribose and xylose in their structural polysaccharide.

See also 
 Arid Forest Research Institute
 Batis

References

External links 

BBC Gardener's Question Time - where there is apparently some confusion between the glasswort (marsh samphire, found in Suffolk) and the rock samphire (found in Dorset).
BBC Good Food Channel - recipes for both marsh samphire and rock samphire.
Biff Vernon discusses the common confusion between marsh samphire and rock samphire, and reproduces a poem on the subject by William Logan.
Robert Freedman 
Reforma journal small article about experimental biodiesel fields in Sonora, Mexico
Seawaterfoundation running a seawater farm in Eritrea with Salicornia to produce oil, food and store carbon dioxide

 
Halophytes
Salt marsh plants
Amaranthaceae genera
Barilla plants